Kenya competed at the 1996 Summer Olympics in Atlanta, United States, from 19 July to 4 August 1996.

Medalists

Results and competitors by event

Archery 

Men

Women

Athletics

Men 

Track and road events

Field events

Women 

Track and road events

Boxing

Shooting

Men

Weightlifting

References

sports-reference

Nations at the 1996 Summer Olympics
1996
Summer Olympics